Vivian Naefe (born 21 March 1953) is a German film director. Her films include the Die wilden Hühner series (based on novels by Cornelia Funke), Waves (based on the novel Wellen by Eduard von Keyserling), and two episodes of the police procedural television series Tatort.

Selected filmography
 Tatort – "Blutiger Asphalt" (1995, TV series episode)
 Four for Venice (1998)
 Tatort – "Kleine Diebe" (2000, TV series episode)
 Waves (2005, TV film)
 Die Wilden Hühner (2006)
 Die Wilden Hühner und die Liebe (2007)
 Die Wilden Hühner und das Leben (2009)
 Das Quartett (2019–22, four episodes of TV series)

References

External links
 

Living people
Film directors from Hamburg
German television directors
German women film directors
German-language film directors
German women screenwriters
German screenwriters
1953 births
Women television directors